Benjamin Silliman (August 8, 1779 – November 24, 1864) was an early American chemist and science educator. He was one of the first American professors of science, at Yale College, the first person to use the process of fractional distillation in America, and a founder of the American Journal of Science, the oldest continuously published scientific journal in the United States.

Early life

Silliman was born in a tavern in North Stratford, now Trumbull, Connecticut, to Mary (Fish) Silliman (widow of John Noyes) and General Gold Selleck Silliman. He was born in August 1779, several months after British forces took his father prisoner and his mother had fled their home in Fairfield, Connecticut, to escape 2,000 British troops who burned Fairfield center to the ground.

Silliman was educated at Yale, receiving a B.A. degree in 1796 and a M.A. in 1799. He studied law with Simeon Baldwin from 1798 to 1799 and became a tutor at Yale from 1799 to 1802. He was admitted to the bar in 1802. That same year he was hired by Yale President Timothy Dwight IV as a professor of chemistry and natural history. Silliman, who had never studied chemistry, prepared for the job by studying chemistry with Professor James Woodhouse at the University of Pennsylvania in Philadelphia. In 1804, he delivered his first lectures in chemistry, which were also the first science lectures ever given at Yale. In 1805, he traveled to University of Edinburgh for further study.

Career

Returning to New Haven, he studied its geology. His chemical analysis of a meteorite that fell in 1807 near Weston, Connecticut, was the first published scientific account of an American meteorite. He lectured publicly at New Haven in 1808 and came to discover many of the constituent elements of many minerals. Some time around 1818, Ephraim Lane took some samples of rocks he found at an area called Saganawamps, now a part of the Old Mine Park Archeological Site in Trumbull, Connecticut, to Silliman for identification. Silliman reported in his new American Journal of Science, a publication covering all the natural sciences but with an emphasis on geology, that he had identified tungsten, tellurium, topaz and fluorite in the rocks. He played a major role in the discoveries of the first fossil fishes found in the United States. In 1837, the first (and at the time only) prismatic barite ore of tungsten in the United States was discovered at the mine. The mineral sillimanite was named after Silliman in 1850. Upon the founding of the Medical School, he also taught there as one of the founding faculty members.

In 1833 he discussed the relationship of Flood geology to the Genesis account, and also wrote about this topic in 1840.

Silliman was an early supporter of coeducation in the Ivy League.  Although Yale wouldn't admit women as students until over 100 years later, he allowed young women into his lecture classes.  His efforts convinced Frederick Barnard, later President of Columbia College, that women ought to be admitted as students. "The elder Silliman, during the entire period of his distinguished career as a Professor of Chemistry, Geology and Mineralogy in Yale College, was accustomed every year to admit to his lecture-courses classes of young women from the schools of New Haven.  In that institution the undersigned had an opportunity to observe, as a student, the effect of the practice, similar to that which he afterward created for himself in Alabama, as a teacher.  The results in both instances, so far as they went, were good; and they went far enough to make it evident that if the presence of young women in college, instead of being occasional, should be constant, they would be better."

American historian David McCullough mentions in his book about early 19th century Americans in Paris that in 1825 Professor Benjamin Silliman while on a tour of Europe conferring with other scientists encountered his former Yale science student Samuel F. B. Morse in the Louvre. McCullough also relates that Silliman would later become president of the college.

As professor emeritus, he delivered lectures at Yale on geology until 1855; Benjamin Silliman Sr had been the first person to use the process of fractional distillation, and, in 1854, Benjamin Silliman Jr became the first person to fractionate petroleum by distillation.

In 1864, Silliman noted oil seeps in the Ojai, California area.  In 1866, this led to the start of oil exploration and development in the Ojai Basin.

Like his son-in-law James Dana, Silliman was a Christian. In an address delivered before the Association of American Geologists he spoke in favor of old-earth creationism, stating:

In the same line of thought, he posed arguments against atheism and materialism.

1807 meteor

At 6:30 in the morning of December 14, 1807, a blazing fireball about two-thirds the apparent size of the moon in the sky, was seen traveling southwards by early risers in Vermont and Massachusetts. Three loud explosions were heard over the town of Weston in Fairfield County, Connecticut. Stone fragments fell in at least 6 places. The largest and only unbroken stone of the Weston fall, which weighed 36.5 pounds (16.5 kilograms), was found some days after Silliman and Kingsley had spent several fruitless hours hunting for it. The owner, a Trumbull farmer named Elijah Seeley, was urged to present it to Yale by local people who had met the professors during their investigation, but he insisted on putting it up for sale. It was purchased by Colonel George Gibbs for his large and famous collection of minerals; when the collection became the property of Yale in 1825, Silliman finally acquired this stone; the only specimen of the Weston meteorite that remains in the Yale Peabody Museum collection today.

Personal life

His first marriage was on September 17, 1809, to Harriet Trumbull, daughter of Connecticut governor Jonathan Trumbull, Jr., who was the son of Governor Jonathan Trumbull, Sr. of Connecticut, a hero of the American Revolution. Silliman and his wife had four children: one daughter married Professor Oliver P. Hubbard, another married Professor James Dwight Dana (Silliman's doctoral student until 1833 and assistant from 1836 to 1837); and youngest daughter Julia married Edward Whiting Gilman, brother of Yale graduate and educator Daniel Coit Gilman.  His son Benjamin Silliman Jr., also a professor of chemistry at Yale, wrote a report that convinced investors to back George Bissell's seminal search for oil. His second marriage was in 1851 to Mrs. Sarah Isabella (McClellan) Webb, daughter of John McClellan. Silliman died at New Haven and is buried in Grove Street Cemetery.

Legacy
Silliman deemed slavery an "enormous evil". He favored colonization of free African Americans in Liberia, serving as a board member of the Connecticut Colonization Society between 1828 and 1835. He was elected a member of the American Antiquarian Society in 1813, and an Associate Fellow of the American Academy of Arts and Sciences in 1815. Silliman founded and edited the American Journal of Science, and was appointed one of the corporate members of the National Academy of Sciences by the United States Congress. He was also a member of the American Association for the Advancement of Science.

Things named for him

Silliman College, one of Yale's residential colleges, is named for him, as is the mineral Sillimanite.

In Sequoia National Park, Mount Silliman is named for him, as is Silliman Pass, a creek and two lakes below the summit of Mount Silliman.

See also
 Connecticut Academy of Arts and Sciences
 Petroleum

Notes

References

Further reading

External links

 
Yale University on Silliman 
The Yale Standard on Silliman
On his abolitionism
Sillimanite

1779 births
1864 deaths
Alumni of the University of Edinburgh
American chemists
American mineralogists
Burials at Grove Street Cemetery
Fellows of the American Academy of Arts and Sciences
Members of the American Antiquarian Society
Members of the United States National Academy of Sciences
Yale University alumni
Yale University faculty
People from Trumbull, Connecticut
Silliman family